The Gambia Socialist Revolutionary Party (GSRP) was a communist party in the West African state of The Gambia, most noted for leading a failed insurrection in 1981 against the government of Dawda Jawara.

Origins and ban

The GSRP was formed in early 1980 by Gibril L George and subsequently banned by the government in October of the same year. The name Gambia Underground Socialist Revolutionary Workers Party (GUSRWP) was adopted.  At this time Kukoi Sanyang, a Gambian socialist, returned from abroad and became active in the party.

1981 coup d'état

On 30 July 1981 the party, along with disaffected members of the Gambia Field Force launched an unsuccessful coup against the government. The insurrection was quickly defeated following the military intervention of Senegal; Gibril George was killed, Kukoi Sanyang fled to Guinea-Bissau and the party effectively dissolved.

References

Banned communist parties
Communist parties in Africa
Defunct political parties in the Gambia
Pan-Africanist political parties in Africa
Politics of the Gambia
Socialism in the Gambia